Camp Boiberik was a Yiddish cultural summer camp founded by Leibush Lehrer in 1913. In 1923 the camp purchased property in Rhinebeck, New York where it would remain until closing in 1981.

Affiliated with the Sholem Aleichem Folk Institute, after Sholom Aleichem, Boiberik was a secular, apolitical institution which emphasized Yiddishkeit or Yiddishkayt, or Eastern European Ashkenazi Jewish folk culture, including songs, dance, food in the tradition of the Borscht belt, theater, and humor. Although non-religious, Boiberik observed shabbos and kept a kosher kitchen.

Boiberik had interactions with and was somewhat similar to Camp Kinder Ring.

The name 'Boiberik' appears as a village in which the Tevye stories by Aleichem are set, as a fictionalization of the resort town Boyarka.

In 1982, the former campgrounds were purchased by the Omega Institute which currently resides there. Omega hosted a reunion of former campers in 1998.

References

A Worthy use of summer: Jewish summer camping in America. Jenna Weissman Joselit, National Museum of American Jewish History (Philadelphia, Pa.) National Museum of American Jewish History, 1993
The New Joys of Yiddish: Completely Updated. Leo Rosten. Random House, Apr 14, 2010
 
Rhinebeck. Michael Frazier. Arcadia Publishing, 2012 
Raising Reds: The Young Pioneers, Radical Summer Camps, and Communist Political Culture in the United States. Paul C. Mishler. Columbia University Press, 1999
 
A Bibliography of Jewish Education in the United States. Norman Drachler. Wayne State University Press, 1996
We Remember with Reverence and Love: American Jews and the Myth of Silence after the Holocaust, 1945-1962. Hasia R. Diner. NYU Press, Apr 1, 2009
The Tribe of Dina: A Jewish Women's Anthology. Melanie Kaye Kantrowitz, Irena Klepfisz. Beacon Press; August 31, 1989. p. 37
The Secular Yiddish School and Summer Camp: A Hundred-Year History. Barnett Zumoff. Jewish Currents. August 9, 2013.

External links
Camp Boiberik Home Page, hosted by MIT Media Lab's Mitchel Resnick
About Omega: Camp Boiberik. Omega Institute

Defunct summer camps
Jewish summer camps in New York (state)
Secular Jewish culture in the United States
Yiddish culture in New York (state)
Borscht Belt